Statistics of Úrvalsdeild in the 1946 season.

Overview
It was contested by 6 teams, and Fram won the championship. Fram's Valtýr Guðmundsson was the top scorer with 6 goals.

League standings

Results

References

Úrvalsdeild karla (football) seasons
Iceland
Iceland
Urvalsdeild